Vladimirovka is a village and municipality in the Quba Rayon of Azerbaijan.  It has a population of 2,492.

References 

Populated places in Quba District (Azerbaijan)